Víctor Manuel Alcérreca Sánchez (born 3 January 1941) is a Mexican politician affiliated with the Institutional Revolutionary Party. As of 2014 he served as Deputy of the LIX Legislature of the Mexican Congress representing Quintana Roo.

References

1941 births
Living people
Politicians from Quintana Roo
People from Cozumel
Members of the Chamber of Deputies (Mexico)
Institutional Revolutionary Party politicians
Instituto Politécnico Nacional alumni
Universidad de Guanajuato alumni
21st-century Mexican politicians